Chattan Singh (Hindi:चट्टान सिँह) is a 1974 Bollywood drama film directed by Kedar Kapoor. It stars Premnath in title role, along with Vinod Mehra, Yogeeta Bali, Aruna Irani in lead roles and music by Kalyanji-Anandji.

Cast
Premnath as Sher Singh / Thakur Chattan Singh
Vinod Mehra as Vishal  
Yogeeta Bali as Rekha
Aruna Irani as Badli Banjaran
Raj Tilak as Inspector Dilip
Prakash Gill as Thakur Durjan Singh
Roopesh Kumar as Chhote Sarkar (Durjan's Son) 
Gurcharan Pohli as Daku Sant Singh
Ajit as Thakur Parvat Singh (Guest Appearance)
Urmila Bhatt as Laxmi Singh
Jagdish Raj as Thanedar

Songs
Lyrics: Verma Malik

"Balma Tu Har Waade Par Karta Hai" - Mubarak Begum
"Mera Chimata Bole Chhanak Chhanak Chhan" - Mukesh, Asha Bhosle
"Jab Koi Ladki, Jab Koi Ladki Baar Baar" - Kishore Kumar, Asha Bhosle
"Har Baar Samandar Ki Har Dhar" - Aziz Nazan, Usha Timothy
"Mai Toh Nahi Jaana Sasural" - Asha Bhosle

External links
 

1974 films
1970s Hindi-language films
1974 drama films
Films scored by Kalyanji Anandji